Pyrops maculatus  is a species of planthopper belonging to the family Fulgoridae. A population is found in Sri Lanka while another is known from southwestern India.

Subspecies
Subspecies are:
 Pyrops maculatus delessertii (Guérin-Méneville, 1840) – found in the Western Ghats of India, treated as Pyrops delessertii by some
 Pyrops maculatus fulvirostris (Walker, 1858) - Sri Lanka
 Pyrops maculatus maculatus (Olivier, 1791)

Distribution
This species is present in Sri Lanka and southern India.

Description
This species shows large white spots on tegmina and a broad brown area along all sutural margin.

References

External links

maculatus
Insects of India
Insects of Sri Lanka
Insects described in 1791
Taxa named by Guillaume-Antoine Olivier